Yasgur is a surname. Notable people with the surname include:

 Max Yasgur (1919–1973), American farmer
 Sam Yasgur (1942–2016), American lawyer